Intruso is the Spanish word for "Intruder". It may refer to:

 Intruso, Spanish film
 El intruso (1944 film), Mexican film
 El Intruso (1999 film), Colombian film
 Intrusos en el espectáculo, Argentine TV program, usually shortened to "Intrusos"

See also
 Intruder (disambiguation)